Edward Russell Meekins Sr. (November 17, 1915 – August 10, 1995) was an American politician who served as a member of the Alaska House of Representatives in 1959 and 1960. Meekins was a Democrat. He was a salesman of new and used cars in Anchorage, Alaska and was popularly known around town as "Hustling Russ". His son Russ Meekins Jr. and his daughter Susan Sullivan also served in the Alaska State Legislature. His grandson was the figure skater Drew Meekins. Another grandson is the popular rapper Cam Meekins.

References

1915 births
1995 deaths
Democratic Party members of the Alaska House of Representatives
Businesspeople from Anchorage, Alaska
Politicians from Anchorage, Alaska
20th-century American politicians
20th-century American businesspeople